Aristomachus (Ancient Greek: Ἀριστόμαχος) may refer to:

Aristomachus (Egypt) (6th century), Byzantine official
Aristomachus (mythology), several figures in Greek mythology
Aristomachos the Elder (died 240 BC), tyrant of the ancient Greek city of Argos
Aristomachos of Argos (died 223 BC), second son of the previous, a tyrant of the city of Argos and strategos of the Achaean League
Aristomachus of Croton (fl. 215 BC), democratic leader who betrayed the town of Croton in Magna Graecia

See also
 Aristomache